Jaycee Carrington Horn (born November 26, 1999) is an American football cornerback for the Carolina Panthers of the National Football League (NFL). He played college football at South Carolina and was drafted eighth overall by the Panthers in the 2021 NFL Draft. His father, Joe Horn, played wide receiver in the National Football League in the 1990s and 2000s.

Early years
Horn attended Alpharetta High School in Alpharetta, Georgia. As a senior, he had 44 tackles and five interceptions. He played in the 2018 U.S. Army All-American Bowl. He was originally committed to play college football at the University of Tennessee but changed to the University of South Carolina.

College career
As a true freshman at South Carolina in 2018, Horn started 10 of 11 games and had 45 tackles with two sacks and was named freshman All-SEC. As a sophomore in 2019, he started all 12 games, recording 40 tackles and one sack. Horn returned to South Carolina as a starter in 2020.  

On November 16, 2020, following the dismissal of former head coach Will Muschamp, Horn opted out of the remainder of the season, turning his focus to preparation for the 2021 NFL Draft.

Professional career

Horn was selected by the Carolina Panthers with the eighth overall pick in the 2021 NFL Draft.
He signed his four-year rookie contract on June 15, 2021, worth $21.1 million. Horn recorded his first career interception off Jameis Winston against the New Orleans Saints in the 26–7 win. During their 24–9 win against the Houston Texans, Horn suffered a fractured foot and was placed on injured reserve on September 27.

Horn returned in 2022 as a starting cornerback for the Panthers. He finished the season with 53 tackles, and a team-leading three interceptions and seven passes defensed through 13 starts.

Personal life
His father, Joe Horn, played as a wide receiver in the NFL. He is also the brother of the free agent Joe Horn Jr.

References

External links
 South Carolina Gamecocks bio

1999 births
Living people
People from Alpharetta, Georgia
Players of American football from Georgia (U.S. state)
American football cornerbacks
South Carolina Gamecocks football players
Sportspeople from Fulton County, Georgia
Carolina Panthers players
Ed Block Courage Award recipients